Sekolah Menengah Kebangsaan Raja Muda  better known as  SMK Raja Muda, is a school located in Parit Jawa, Muar, Johor, Malaysia.

See also
 List of schools in Johor

References

External links 
 School website
 

        

1995 establishments in Malaysia
Educational institutions established in 1995
Muar District
Secondary schools in Malaysia
Schools in Johor